Boys' Town Football Club is a Jamaican football club based in Kingston, which currently plays in the Jamaica National Premier League.

The team is based in Kingston, Jamaica, with their home ground at the Collie Smith Drive Sporting Complex, which can hold up to 2,000 spectators.

It is said that Bob Marley was a fan of this club.

History
Boys' Town was founded as a Christian project in 1940 by Reverend Father Hugh Sherlock for the young people in Kingston's Trench Town community. They have won the national league title on three occasions, the most recent in 1988.

Recent seasons
After finishing runners-up to Tivoli Gardens in the 2010–11 season, they started the 2011–12 season on a low after fielding an ineligible player (Marvin Morgan, Jr.) in their first two matches and were deducted one point.

Honours
Jamaica National Premier League
Champions (3): 1984, 1986, 1989

JFF Champions Cup
Winners (2): 2009, 2010

See also
Boys' Town Cricket Club

References

External links
 Team profile at Golocaljamaica

Football clubs in Jamaica
Association football clubs established in 1940
1940 establishments in Jamaica